Jon Dasilva is a British DJ and producer. As a former resident of Manchester club, The Haçienda, he is widely regarded as an influential figure in the early UK house scene.

Hacienda residency and DJ career 
After graduating in Film and History from the University of Kent, Jon moved to Manchester. His mixing skills and innovative style were quickly noticed and he was soon offered a residency at legendary Manchester club, Fac 51 The Hacienda. Dasilva and DJ Mike Pickering started the wildly popular Ibiza-inspired HOT nights, which are seen by many as the birthplace of UK acid house, alongside Danny Rampling's Shoom.

During his residency at The Hacienda, he became well known for his use of a cappella vocals and sound effects. Such techniques influenced a new generation of young DJs, including Sasha, who credits Dasilva for teaching him how to mix harmonically and build sets.

Since leaving The Hacienda, Dasilva's career has taken him around the world. He was the first guest DJ to be booked by Slam (Soma Records) in Glasgow back in 1989, first UK DJ to play Tresor in Berlin around 1990. He was also one of the first British DJs to play China in the mid-90s, and was resident on the first Strictly Rhythm Records Tour alongside Todd Terry and a young Roger Sanchez. Since 2015 he has been one of the resident DJs at 'I Love Acid', currently the longest running dedicated, regular Acid House club night in the UK (established 2007) and winner of DJ Mag's Best Club Event 2019 award.

Production 
Jon has remixed for bands such as; New Fast Automatic Daffodils, New Order, A Certain Ratio, Inspiral Carpets and M People, and has released productions on labels including Ellum Audio, Rush Hour, Soma, Mute, Deconstruction, Better Days, Eskimo, DMC and many others. 

Some release highlights include "Soul On Ice" featuring Rowetta from the Happy Mondays on vocals, "Hot" by Ideal, Jon's most successful solo project to date and Jon's blistering remix of Screen IIs, "Hey Mr. DJ", on Cleveland City Records. Jon was signed to Cleveland City for some years.

In 2013, Jon collaborated with Maceo Plex to produce "Love Somebody Else" which won "Best House Track" that year at the International Dance Awards in Miami. He is currently finishing a second album with his band The Virgo Mechanically Replayed, alongside a solo E.P. and collaborations with Josef K and Posthuman.

External links

Interview with Manchesterad
Biography in Russian
Resident Advisor
Interview with Decoded magazine
Mixcloud
Soundcloud
Jondasilva.net

British record producers
English DJs
DJs from Manchester
English house musicians
Living people
Remixers
1963 births
Alumni of the University of Kent
Madchester musicians